Surapura, also called Shorapur, is a city and taluka in Yadgir district in the Indian state of Karnataka and a historical place. Surapura was the land of the famous prince of Surapura aasthana, Raja Venkatappa Nayaka, the young rebel freedom fighter against British rule.

Demographics

 India census, Surapura had a population of 43,591. Males constituted 51% of the population and females 49%. Surapura has an average literacy rate of 55%, lower than the national average of 59.5%: male literacy is 65% and female literacy is 46%. In Surapura, 16% of the population is under 6 years of age.

Surapura is known for the Shree Venugopala Swami Temple. Even today, all the disciplines offered in the Tirumala Temple at Tirupati were started from the contributions of the then Surapura (Shorapur) kings. They never visit the Tirumala temple, but a representative would be sent on their behalf. From 1703 the bedara (tribal) kingdom rose and ruled it up to 1858, with the last king being Raja Nalvadi Venkatappa Naayaka. Bonal Bird Sanctuary is located about 10 km from Surapura.

The major occupation of the people in and around Surapura is farming. Surapura is a large producer of cotton, pulses and paddy. Major attractions are the fort (Durbaar), Taylor Manzil, Gopalswami Temple, Jain Temple and Devar Baavi.

Literature 
The town has been vividly described in the autobiography of Philip Meadows Taylor - The story of my life and also Jamiya Masjid of Timmapur.

References
 
Philip Meadows Taylor. The story of my life, by M. Taylor. Ed. by his daughter (A.M. Taylor). Oxford University, 1882.

External links
 

Cities and towns in Yadgir district
Taluks in Yadgiri district